The National Securities and Stock Market Commission of Ukraine or NSSMC is a public institution, which carries out the supervision of participants of Ukrainian capital markets, ensures enhancing stability, competitiveness and development of the capital markets as well as protection of the interests of investors, prevention of abuse and offenses.

The NSSMC is under the jurisdiction of the president of Ukraine while being accountable to the Parliament of Ukraine. It was formerly known as the State Commission on Securities and Stock Market.

About public institution 

The national securities and stock market commission is a state collegiate body subordinated to the president of Ukraine and accountable to the Verkhovna Rada of Ukraine.

The NSSMC is composed of the chairman of the commission and six members of the commission, who are appointed and dismissed in accordance with the decrees of the president of Ukraine.

The system of the body includes: the central body and four territorial bodies.

The main form of work of the commission is meetings, which are regularly held at the decision of the chairman of the commission (twice a week).

The purpose of the NSSMC is to create, through its regulatory and supervisory functions, the conditions for the proper and efficient functioning of the securities market, to provide cash capital to the needs of the country's economy by creating a mechanism for the accumulation, distribution and redistribution of funds from a person who has free investment resources to a person, which needs such resources for development, creation of conditions for formation of powerful domestic investors and protection of rights of investors.

The mission of the NSSMC is to ensure the implementation of a single state policy on securities and the functioning of the stock market in Ukraine, as well as to implement legal regulation of relations arising on the market, protection of interests of citizens of Ukraine and the state, prevention of abuse and offenses, coordination activities of ministries and other central bodies of state executive power in this sphere.

History 

The commission was formed June 12, 1995, with the aim of a comprehensive legal regulation of relations arising in the securities market, to protect the country's and citizens' interest rights, and prevent abuse and violation in this area in accordance with paragraph 7-4 of Article 114-5 of the Constitution of the Ukrainian SSR. president of Ukraine (L. Kuchma) Decree of June 12, 1995 No.446/95. Commission created a central executive body, its territorial authorities approved the Regulation on the Commission and appointed the first office executive – Mozhovyi Oleh.

The new regulation on the Commission appeared two years later, on February 14, 1997. According to it, the implementation of the new Law of Ukraine "On State Regulation of Securities Market in Ukraine" the SEC was declared a state body, subordinate and accountable to the president of Ukraine and Verkhovna Rada of Ukraine.

From October 7, 2010, to July 7, 2011, continuing the range of political reforms, the SEC was subject to President of Ukraine review request executed by Verkhovna Rada of Ukraine and Cabinet of Ministers of Ukraine

On July 7, 2011, the authority changed its name to its current form. On November 23, 2011, the existing provisions came into effect

See also
Ministry of Finance (Ukraine)
National Bank of Ukraine

References 

1995 establishments in Ukraine
Independent agencies of the Ukrainian government
Organizations based in Kyiv